Unión Tarapoto is a Peruvian football club that plays in the city of Tarapoto, San Martín, Peru.

Former players

  Fernelly Castillo

Honours

Regional
Región II:
Runner-up (1): 2007

Liga Departamental de San Martín:
Winners (5): 1979, 1980, 1987, 2009, 2018
Runner-up (3): 1994, 2007, 2015

Liga Provincial de San Martín:
Winners (4): 2007, 2009, 2015, 2018

Liga Distrital de Tarapoto:
Winners (6): 2009, 2010, 2015, 2017, 2018, 2019
Runner-up (2): 2011, 2012

See also
List of football clubs in Peru
Peruvian football league system
 1989 Torneo Plácido Galindo

References

Football clubs in Peru
Tarapoto